Victor Leslie Smith (13 July 1893 – 25 February 1972) was an Australian rules footballer who played with South Melbourne in the Victorian Football League (VFL).

Notes

External links 

1893 births
1972 deaths
Australian rules footballers from Victoria (Australia)
Sydney Swans players